In the Latter Day Saint movement, a covenant is a promise made between God and a person or a group of people. God sets the conditions of the covenant, and as the conditions are met, he blesses the person who entered into and kept the covenant. If the covenant is violated, blessings are withheld and in some cases a penalty or punishment is inflicted.

Latter Day Saint leaders teach that just as the God of Israel asked the children of Israel to be a covenant people, "a peculiar treasure unto me ... a kingdom of priests, and an holy nation," today God has asked for a latter-day people who will make and keep covenants with him. All covenants are considered part of the overarching "new and everlasting covenant" of the gospel.

The Church of Jesus Christ of Latter-day Saints (LDS Church) teaches that one enters a covenant through a ritual or a visible sign. Some leaders have taught that a covenant is always associated with an ordinance. Other leaders have suggested that commandments that include promised blessings for compliance—such as the law of tithing and Word of Wisdom—also constitute covenants.

In the LDS Church, ordinances which are accompanied by covenants include baptism and confirmation; reception of the Melchizedek priesthood; the temple endowment; and celestial marriage. These are known as "saving ordinances" and are a requirement for exaltation.

Officially, partaking of the sacrament is considered by the LDS Church to be a renewal of the covenants made at baptism; however, some Latter-day Saint leaders have taught that doing so constitutes a renewal of all covenants a person has made.

Table of covenants associated with saving ordinances

Notes

References
 Bonnie D. Parkin, "Celebrating Covenants", Ensign, May 1995, p. 78.
 Joseph Fielding Smith (1954). Doctrines of Salvation, 1:152–66.

External links

 Covenants

Latter Day Saint belief and doctrine
Latter Day Saint temple practices
Latter Day Saint terms